Khristenko is a gender-neutral Ukrainian surname. Notable people with the surname include:

Stanislav Khristenko (born 1984), Ukrainian-American pianist
Viktor Khristenko (born 1957), Russian politician 

Ukrainian-language surnames